Juan Antonio Guerrero de la Cruz (born February 1, 1967) is a former professional baseball player. He played 79 games for the Major League Baseball Houston Astros in 1992, mostly as an infielder.

Personal life
Guerrero has been married to Veronika Guerrero for more than 20 years. He has a son called Luis Guerrero who lives in the United States with his grandmother.

External links

1967 births
Living people
Catskill Cougars players
Dominican Republic expatriate baseball players in the United States
Elmira Pioneers players
Houston Astros players

Major League Baseball infielders
Major League Baseball players from the Dominican Republic
China Times Eagles players
Clinton Giants players
Pocatello Giants players
San Jose Giants players
Saraperos de Saltillo players
Shreveport Giants players
Tucson Toros players
Dominican Republic expatriate baseball players in Mexico
Dominican Republic expatriate baseball players in Taiwan